Craig Campbell may refer to:

Craig Campbell (BMX rider) (born 1969), retired British BMX freestyle rider
Craig Campbell (comedian) (born 1969), Canadian comedian
Craig Campbell (politician) (born 1952), lieutenant governor of Alaska
Craig Campbell (singer) (born 1979), country music artist from Lyons, Georgia
Craig Campbell (album), his debut album
Craig Campbell (tennis) (born 1963), South African tennis player
Craig Campbell (tenor) (1878–1965), Canadian tenor 

Campbell, Craig